Zdzisław Harlender (15 June 1898 – 11 September 1939) was a Polish pilot, army officer and writer.

Biography 
After serving in World War I, where Harlender was wounded in the Battle of Lemberg, he volunteered for the Polish Airforce and was trained as a pilot. In 1921 he was demobilized and after studies at the Academy of Foreign Trade in Lwów and Warsaw School of Economics he worked as a teacher and journalist. In 1932 he was enrolled in a military officer school and in 1934 was appointed as an infantry lieutenant.

Harlender published five books from 1933 to 1939: two on economics, one a war memoir, and the last on politics. In Czciciele Dadźbóg Swarożyca from 1937, he lays out his vision for the revival of the pre-Christian Slavic religion. Although a nationalist and a neopagan, he stood outside of the Polish neopagan milieus of his time.

He was mobilized in the Polish Army when World War II broke out and died on 11 September 1939.

Bibliography 
 Manipulowana waluta wewnętrzna i pieniądz do wypłat międzynarodowych, Warsaw 1933
 Na podniebnych szlakach. (Zakochani w maszynach), Warsaw 1935
 Waluta o ustalonej sile nabywczej, Warsaw 1935
 Czciciele Dadźbóg Swarożyca, Warsaw 1937
 Polski dynamizm polityczny: praca dyskusyjna, Warsaw 1939

See also 
 Slavic Native Faith in Poland

References

Further reading 

 

1898 births
1939 deaths
Polish aviators
Polish Army officers
Polish people of World War I
Polish military personnel killed in World War II
Polish modern pagans
Modern pagan writers
Military personnel from Kraków